Muhammed Doğan Şenli (born July 16, 1992) is a Turkish professional basketball player, who plays as a center for Merkezefendi Bld. Denizli Basket of the Turkish Basketball Super League (BSL).

Professional career
Senli spent the 2019-20 season with Bahçeşehir Koleji. 

On October 7, 2020, he signed with Gaziantep Basketbol.

On July 31, 2021, he has signed with Semt77 Yalovaspor of the Turkish Basketbol Süper Ligi.

On July 6, 2022, he has signed with Merkezefendi Belediyesi Denizli Basket of the Basketbol Süper Ligi.

References

External links
Doğan Şenli FIBA Europe Cup Profile
Doğan Şenli TBLStat.net Profile
Doğan Şenli Eurobasket Profile
Doğan Şenli TBL Profile

Living people
1994 births
Bahçeşehir Koleji S.K. players
Beşiktaş men's basketball players
Centers (basketball)
Eskişehir Basket players
Gaziantep Basketbol players
Merkezefendi Belediyesi Denizli Basket players
Sportspeople from Van, Turkey
Tofaş S.K. players
Turkish men's basketball players
Yalovaspor BK players